The 1896 Summer Olympics, officially known as the Games of the I Olympiad, were a summer multi-sport event held in Athens, the capital of Greece, from 6 to 15 April 1896, and were the first Olympic Games of the Modern era.

A total of 241 athletes from 14 nations participated in 43 events in nine sports at these games.

Ten of the fourteen participating nations earned medals, in addition to three medals won by mixed teams, i.e. teams made up of athletes from multiple nations. The United States won the most gold medals (11) with 14 athletes participating, while host nation, Greece with 169 athletes participating, won the most medals overall (47) as well as the most silver (18) and bronze (19) medals, finishing with one less gold medal than the United States, having 155 athletes more than the US.

In the early Olympic Games, several team events were contested by athletes from multiple nations. Retroactively, the IOC created the designation "Mixed team" (with the country code ZZX) to refer to these group of athletes.
Some athletes won medals both individually and as part of a mixed team, so these medals are tabulated under different nations in the official counts. Dionysios Kasdaglis, an athlete of Greek origins living in Alexandria, Egypt, is listed by the IOC as Greek during both his competition in the singles tennis competition and the doubles tennis competition along with his teammate, the Greek athlete Demetrios Petrokokkinos.

During these inaugural Olympics, winners were given a silver medal and an olive branch, while runners-up received a copper medal and a laurel branch. The IOC has retroactively assigned gold, silver and bronze medals to the three best placed athletes in each event to comport with more recent traditions.
Three ties resulted in medals being shared between athletes, increasing the medal count of various nations. These include ties between Francis Lane of the United States and Alajos Szokolyi of Hungary, for the third place in the 100 metres; between Evangelos Damaskos and Ioannis Theodoropoulos of Greece in the pole vault; and between Konstantinos Paspatis of Greece and Momcsilló Tapavicza of Hungary, in singles tennis.
In addition, bronze medals were not awarded in a number of events where there was no third-place finisher.

Medal count

This is the full table of the medal count of the 1896 Summer Olympics, based on the medal count of the International Olympic Committee (IOC). There are sources, besides the International Olympic Committee (IOC), that display variations in the medal totals, but as the governing body of the Olympic Games, the IOC is considered the most authoritative source for the purposes of this article. These rankings sort by the number of gold medals earned by a country. The number of silver medals is taken into consideration next and then the number of bronze medals. If, after the above, countries are still tied, equal ranking is given and they are listed alphabetically. This information is provided by the IOC; however, the IOC does not recognise or endorse any ranking system.

References

External links
 
 
 

Medal table
1896